Alexandrovka is a rural locality (a selo) in Otradnenskoye Rural Settlement, Novousmansky District, Voronezh Oblast, Russia. The population was 550 as of 2010. There are 55 streets.

Geography 
Alexandrovka is located 13 km southwest of Novaya Usman (the district's administrative centre) by road. Novonikolsky is the nearest rural locality.

References 

Rural localities in Novousmansky District